The Lakes Sea Bird was a two-seat floatplane built during 1912 by the Lakes Flying Company using the fuselage  of the Avro Duigan which had been built by Avro for John Robertson Duigan. It gave many visitors to Windermere their first flight in the summer of 1913

Development
After Duigan damaged his aircraft and returned to Australia  the fuselage and tail unit were sold to the Lakes Flying Co. based at Windermere, who rebuilt it as a two-seat floatplane. The straight parallel-chord high aspect ratio wings of irregular three-bay layout resembled those of Avro's Avro Type D. It was  originally fitted with a single central two-step float, later changed to a pair of narrower floats, and demountable so that the aircraft could readily be used as a landplane. It was powered by a rotary 7-cylinder Gnome of 50 hp (37 kW),

Operational history

The single Sea Bird carried many holiday makers in 1912-3.  Later, it was restored for training but was lost in 1915 when a student pilot spun it in.

Specifications

References

Avro Aircraft since 1908 Jackson A.J.. London Putnam: 1965
Lewis, P  RBritish Aircraft 1809-1914. London, Putnam: 1962

1910s British aircraft